Nature Neuroscience is a monthly scientific journal published by Nature Publishing Group. Its focus is original research papers relating specifically to neuroscience and was established in May 1998. The chief editor is Shari Wiseman. According to the Journal Citation Reports, Nature Neuroscience had a 2020 impact factor of 24.884.

References

External links
 

Neuroscience journals
Nature Research academic journals
Publications established in 1998
Monthly journals
English-language journals